The Apple A4 is a 32-bit package on package (PoP) system on a chip (SoC) designed by Apple Inc. and manufactured by Samsung. It was the first SoC Apple designed in-house. The first product to feature the A4 was the first-generation iPad, followed by the iPhone 4, fourth-generation iPod Touch, and second-generation Apple TV.

The last operating system update Apple provided for a mobile device containing an A4 (iPhone 4) was iOS 7.1.2, which was released on June 30, 2014 as it was discontinued with the release of iOS 8 in September 2014. The last operating system update Apple provided for an Apple TV containing an A4 (second-generation Apple TV) was Apple TV Software 6.2.1, which was released on September 17, 2014.

Design 
Apple engineers designed the A4 chip with an emphasis on being "extremely powerful yet extremely power efficient." The A4 features a single-core ARM Cortex-A8 central processing unit (CPU) manufactured on Samsung's 45 nm fabrication process using performance enhancements developed by chip designer Intrinsity (which was subsequently acquired by Apple) in collaboration with Samsung. The resulting CPU, dubbed "Hummingbird", is able to run at a far higher clock rate than previous Cortex-A8 CPUs while remaining fully compatible with the Cortex-A8 design provided by ARM. The same Cortex-A8 used in the A4 is also used in Samsung's S5PC110A01 SoC. The A4 also features a single-core PowerVR SGX535 graphics processing unit (GPU). The die of the A4 takes up 53.3 mm² of area.

The clock rate of the Cortex-A8 in the A4 used inside the first-generation iPad is 1 GHz. The clock rate of the Cortex-A8 in the A4 used inside the iPhone 4 and fourth-generation iPod Touch is 800 MHz (underclocked from 1 GHz). It is unknown what the clock rate of the Cortex-A8 in the A4 used inside the second-generation Apple TV is.

The A4 uses the PoP method of installation to support RAM. The top package of the A4 used inside the first-generation iPad, the fourth-generation iPod Touch, and the second-generation Apple TV contains two 128 MB LPDDR chips, providing a total of 256 MB of RAM. The top package of the A4 used inside the iPhone 4 contains two 256 MB LPDDR chips, providing a total of 512 MB of RAM. The RAM is connected to the A4 using ARM's 64 bits wide AMBA 3 AXI bus.

Products featuring the Apple A4 
 iPad (1st generation)
 iPhone 4
 iPod Touch (4th generation)
Apple TV (2nd generation)

Gallery

See also 
 Apple silicon, the range of ARM-based SoCs designed by Apple.
 PWRficient, a series of microprocessors designed by P.A. Semi. Apple acquired P.A. Semi to form an in-house custom chip design department.

References

External links 
 MacWorld – Apple inside: the significance of the iPad's A4 chip
 CNET—Inside the iPad: Apple's new 'A4' chip 
 HotHardware—iPad's Identity Crisis and Apple's A4 CPU Showstopper
 EETimes—Apple's A4 dissected
 Understanding iPad’s A4 Processor
 ARM Cortex-A series processors
 PowerVR GPU specifications pages 

Products introduced in 2010
Products and services discontinued in 2014
Apple silicon